Rosa Maria Antonetta Paulina Assing (née Varnhagen; 28 May 1783, Düsseldorf – 22 January 1840, Hamburg) was a German lyric poet, prose-writer, educator, translator, and silhouette artist. She was the elder sister of Karl August Varnhagen, sister-in-law of Rahel Levin, wife of David Assing (1787 – 1842), and mother of Ottilie and Ludmilla Assing. Her friends included Amalie Schoppe, David Veit, and Fanny Tarnow.

References
 Johann Friedrich Ludwig Theodor Merzdorf: "Assing, David." In: Allgemeine Deutsche Biographie (ADB). Band 1, Duncker & Humblot, Leipzig 1875, S. 624 f. – Nebeneintrag

1783 births
1840 deaths
Writers from Düsseldorf
People from the Electoral Palatinate
19th-century German educators
German women poets
Writers from North Rhine-Westphalia
Silhouettists
Varnhagen family
German salon-holders
19th-century German poets
19th-century German women writers
19th-century German artists
19th-century German women artists
19th-century German translators